Elvira Woodruff (born June 19, 1951) is an American children's writer known for books that include elements of fantasy and history.

Writing
Elvira Pirozzi was born in Somerville, New Jersey, and attended Adelphi University and Boston University for one year each as an English literature major. She held diverse jobs including janitor, gardener, ice-cream truck driver, receptionist, window-dresser, store owner, and baker. Her first marriage did not last, and she found herself divorced and raising two young sons. She worked as a librarian in Easton, Pennsylvania and read stories to young children. She began writing. By 1999, she had written twenty children's books.

Reviews

Kirkus Reviews described her book Small Beauties as a "little history in a lovely story," and her book The Memory Coat as an exploration of how Russian-Jewish families escaped oppression to come to America. Publishers Weekly described her book The Summer I Shrunk My Grandmother as a deft blend of "magic and farce" and a "lighthearted romp about a somewhat misguided budding scientist".

Books

Dear Levi

 Dear Levi: Letters from the Overland Trail: Letters from the Overland Trail (Alfred A. Knopf, 1994), illustrated by Beth Peck 
 Dear Austin: Letters from the Underground Railroad (Knopf, 1998), illus. Nancy Carpenter

Time Travelers

 George Washington's Socks (Scholastic, 1991)
 George Washington’s Spy: A Time-travel Adventure (2010)

Other 
 Awfully Short for the Fourth Grade (Holiday House, 1989), illus. Will Hillenbrand – Woodruff's first book published
 The Summer I Shrank My Grandmother (1990)
 Tubtime (Holiday House, 1990)
 Mrs. McClosky's Monkeys (Scholastic, 1991) – Woodruff's first manuscript sale
 Back in Action (1991)
 The Wing Shop (1991)
 Show And Tell (1991)
 Dear Napoleon, I Know You're Dead, But ... (Holiday House, 1992), illus. Noah and Jess Woodruff 
 The Disappearing Bike Shop (1992)
 Ghosts Don't Get Goose Bumps (1993)
 The Secret Funeral of Slim Jim the Snake (1993)
 The Magnificent Mummy Maker (1994)
 Dragon in My Backpack (1996)
 The Orphan Of Ellis Island: A Time-travel Adventure (1997) 
 Can You Guess Where We're Going? (1998)
 The Memory Coat (1999)
 The Ghost of Lizard Light (1999)
 The Christmas Doll (2000)
 The Ravenmaster's Secret: Escape from the Tower of London (Scholastic, 2003)
 Small Beauties: The Journey of Darcy Heart O'Hara (2006)
 Fearless (2007)
 To Knit or Not to Knit: Helpful and Humorous Hints for the Passionate Knitter (2014)

References

External links
 
 
 
 

1951 births
Living people
American children's writers
American historical novelists
People from Raritan, New Jersey
Writers from Somerville, New Jersey
20th-century American novelists
American women novelists
20th-century American women writers
Women historical novelists
21st-century American women
Novelists from New Jersey